The Gran Premio Bruno Beghelli Internazionale Donne Elite is a women's one-day cycle race which starts and finishes in Monteveglio in Italy. It is currently rated by the UCI as category 1.1.

Overall winners

References 

Women's cycle races
Cycle races in Italy